Javier Sordo Madaleno Bringas (b. October 16, 1956) is a Mexican architect, son of Juan Sordo Madaleno, also a renowned architect. Javier has designed several large shopping malls in the 2000s and 2010s including:
Artz Pedregal in Pedregal, Mexico City
Antara Polanco, Mexico City
Toreo Parque Central on the border of Mexico City and Naucalpan

References

20th-century Mexican architects
21st-century Mexican architects
1956 births
Living people